Pseudosparianthis is a genus of huntsman spiders that was first described by Eugène Louis Simon in 1887.

Species
 it contains eight species, found in the Caribbean, Central America, Guyana, Venezuela, Brazil, and French Guiana:
Pseudosparianthis accentuata Caporiacco, 1955 – Venezuela
Pseudosparianthis ambigua Caporiacco, 1938 – Guatemala
Pseudosparianthis chickeringi (Gertsch, 1941) – Panama
Pseudosparianthis fusca Simon, 1887 (type) – Brazil
Pseudosparianthis jayuyae Petrunkevitch, 1930 – Puerto Rico
Pseudosparianthis megalopalpa Caporiacco, 1954 – French Guiana
Pseudosparianthis picta Simon, 1887 – Brazil, Guyana
Pseudosparianthis ravida Simon, 1898 – St. Vincent

See also
 List of Sparassidae species

References

Araneomorphae genera
Sparassidae
Spiders of Central America
Spiders of South America